This is a list of U.S. county name etymologies, covering the letters N to R.

N

O

P

Q

R

See also
Lists of U.S. county name etymologies for links to the remainder of the list.

References